Persifer Township is one of twenty-one townships in Knox County, Illinois, USA.  As of the 2010 census, its population was 980 and it contained 835 housing units.

Geography

Unincorporated towns
 Appleton at 
 Dahinda at 
 Oak Run at 
 Trenton Corners at 
(This list is based on USGS data and may include former settlements.)

Cemeteries
The township contains these three cemeteries: Bradford, Myers and Trenton.

Demographics

School districts
 Knoxville Community Unit School District 202
 Williamsfield Community Unit School District 210

Political districts
 Illinois's 18th congressional district
 State House District 74
 State Senate District 37

References
 
 United States Census Bureau 2009 TIGER/Line Shapefiles
 United States National Atlas

External links
 City-Data.com
 Illinois State Archives
 Township Officials of Illinois

Townships in Knox County, Illinois
Galesburg, Illinois micropolitan area
Townships in Illinois